Diaphanopellis is a genus of rust fungi in the family Coleosporiaceae. Reported as new to science in 2005, the genus is monotypic, containing the single species Diaphanopellis forrestii, found growing on Rhododendron selense subsp. selense, in the Himalayas.

References

External links
 

Pucciniales
Taxa described in 2005
Fungi of Asia
Monotypic Basidiomycota genera